Southland Boys' High School (SBHS) is an all-boys school in Invercargill, New Zealand, and has been the only one in the city since Marist Brothers was merged with St Catherines to form Verdon College in 1982.

History

SBHS was founded in 1881 and, in 1926, the original brick building was opened on the present Herbert St site. This building is called the Pearce Block in memory of Mr T. Pearce who was rector from around 1904 to 1929. Subsequent buildings were named after George Uttley, Malcolm Leadbetter, Don Grant and Laurie Cornwell. The gymnasium was named after Jim Page.

The west end of the Pearce Block suffered a fire during Easter 1980 which was well recorded in the 1980 year book "The Southlandian". The fire extensively damaged three class rooms on the upper floor whilst the Rector's, DP's and Senior Master's offices on the ground floor were water damaged (in the right hand side of the photo).

The school co-hosted the 2006 State Twenty20 Cricket Knock-Out Tournament in Invercargill.

Notable alumni

Well-known former students include Jeremy Waldron, who attended the school until 1970 and is now a prominent legal and political philosopher in the United States, and Andrew White, who played rugby for the All Blacks in the 1920s. Back in the early 1980s there were several rows of framed photos in the downstairs corridor of the Grant Block of Old Boys who had gone on to represent New Zealand at rugby or cricket. One student, Brian McKechnie, is the only Double All Black to date. He played 26 Tests for the All Blacks between 1977-1981 at Full Back and First Five-Eighth and also represented The New Zealand Black Caps in Cricket between 1975-1981. The Leadbetter Wing also had framed photos of the First 15 rugby team dating back to around 1913. Other notable All Blacks are 100 test veteran Malili (Mils) Muliaina, former captain Paul Henderson who also played professional rugby for the Highlanders in Super Rugby, props Jamie Mackintosh, and Clarke Dermody. The school also has a proud tradition in providing New Zealand schoolboys Rugby representatives. Recent names include Robbie Robinson, John Hardie and Scott Eade.  Gordon Hunter played two games for the Otago rugby team, coached them from 1992-1995 in the National Provincial Championship and was the first coach of the Highlanders in 1996. Between 1996-1999 he served as an assistant coach and selector for the All Blacks, moving to Auckland to coach The  Blues in 2000. Hunter retired soon after that due to ill health, passing away in 2002 from cancer.   

Outside sport, George Mason has made a name for himself in television with recurring roles in hit programs such as Shortland Street, Go Girls, and most recently Home and Away (Australian soap). Also in the arts scene, New Zealand cartoonist Shaun Yeo began his career supplying cartoons and illustrations to The Southland Times while still a student at the school.

Dave Cull, a former Mayor of Dunedin, who attended the school from 1963 to 1967, died on 27 April 2021.

Houses
There are five houses at Southland Boys' High School, four of which are named after past Rectors of the school, with Coldstream House being the exception. The Houses compete in Sports Days, Cultural Competitions, Swimming Competitions, Drama Productions, Fundraising Events among other activities.

 Coldstream House is represented by the colour Orange.
 Deaker House
 Grant House is represented by the colour Green.
 Uttley House is represented by the colour Blue.
 Pearce House

Rectors
Rectors of the school are as follows:
 Mr G W Blanchflower (1881 - 1885)
 Mr A H Highton (1886 - 1893)
 Mr H L Fowler (1893 - 1903)
 Mr T D Pearce (1904 - 1929)
 Dr George Uttley (1930 - 1946)
 Mr Malcolm Leadbetter (1947 - 1950)
 Mr Don Grant (1950 - 1963)
 Mr Laurie Cornwell (1963 - 1981)
 Mr Jack Alabaster (1981 - 1988)
 Mr Rowly Currie (1989 - 1999)
 Mr Ian Baldwin (2000 - 2017)
 Mr Simon Coe (2017 - )

Notes

External links
All issues of the school's magazine (The Southlandian) from 1902 to 2019

Boarding schools in New Zealand
Boys' schools in New Zealand
Schools in Invercargill
Educational institutions established in 1881
Secondary schools in Southland, New Zealand
1881 establishments in New Zealand
1920s architecture in New Zealand